Charles Haskell Danforth (30 November 1883 – 10 January 1969) was an American anatomist and professor at Stanford University. He took a special interest in problems of heredity and comparative anatomy.

Danforth was born in Oxford, Maine to James and Mary Haskell. He had an early interest in botany growing up in Norway, Maine. An uncle, Frank Danforth passed on a copy of Darwin's Animals and Plants under Domestication to him at the age of twelve. His observation on dimorphism in Tiarella cordifolia made around the age of twelve was published in 1911. His father's friends included the brother of Professor Sidney I. Smith and the brother-in-law of Professor A.E. Verrill. When he wrote to Professor Verrill seeking advice about becoming a naturalist, he received the response that he should not "unless you can't help it." Educated at Norway Liberal Institute, he went to Tufts College earning a BA in 1908 and an MA in 1910. He then moved to Washington University in St. Louis where he received a PhD in 1912 for his work on the comparative anatomy of Polyodon. After serving as an instructor in anatomy until 1914, he became an associate at Washington University in St. Louis in 1914, becoming associate professor in 1916. In the summer of 1917 he taught ornithology at the University of Montana lab on Flathead Lake. He joined Stanford University in 1921 under A.W. Meyer and became a full professor in 1923, serving there until his retirement in 1949.  

Danforth published nearly 125 papers, many influenced by naturalistic observation. Sitting in a theatre, Danforth noticed the hairy hands of a person seated in front of him and after comparing his own hair distribution took up a study of hair growth patterning on the back of the hands and fingers. He also examined hair in greater detail. He also examined heredity using breeding experiments in rats, chickens, pheasants, and cats. At the end of World War II, Danforth examined the morphometrics of 104 thousand soldiers discharged from the American army, which has been used to compare physical stature changes over time.

He married science teacher Florence Wenonah Garrison in 1914 and they had three sons.

References 

1883 births
1969 deaths
American anatomists
Tufts University alumni
Washington University in St. Louis alumni
Washington University in St. Louis faculty
Stanford University faculty